Eiko Gakuen is a private Catholic junior and senior high school for boys, located in  

Oboe, Kamakura, in the Kanagawa Prefecture of Japan. The school was founded in 1947 by the Society of Jesus. The school's patron saint is the Jesui Aloysius Gonzaga, and the motto is taken from that of the Jesuits: , translated as "for the greater glory of God."

Education 
There is heavy emphasis on learning and discipline. Ethics class is compulsory but religious and biblical studies are optional.

See also

 List of schools in Japan
 List of Jesuit schools

References

External links
 Eiko Gakuen
Jesuit secondary schools in Japan
Boys' schools in Japan
Educational institutions established in 1947
1947 establishments in Japan
Schools in Kanagawa Prefecture
Buildings and structures in Kamakura, Kanagawa